Edward I. Kasid (August 13, 1923 – November 3, 1989) was a Polish American professional basketball player. He spent one season in the Basketball Association of America (BAA) as a member of the Toronto Huskies during the 1946–47 season. He was born in Minnesota to Joseph and Josephine Kasid. Kasid attended Minneapolis Vocational High School.

BAA career statistics

Regular season

References

External links
 

1923 births
1989 deaths
American expatriate basketball people in Canada
Basketball players from Minnesota
Toronto Huskies players
Undrafted National Basketball Association players
American men's basketball players
Guards (basketball)